Camp Municipal Narcís Sala is a football stadium in Barcelona, Catalonia, Spain. It is the home of the team UE Sant Andreu. Following work in late 2010, the stadium now has an all-seater capacity for 6,563 spectators.

External links
Estadios de España

References

Football venues in Barcelona
UE Sant Andreu
Sports venues completed in 1970